Debut of a Legend is an album by jazz violinist Johnny Frigo that was released by Chesky in 1994.

Track listing 
 "Get Happy" (Harold Arlen, Ted Koehler) – 4:33
 "I'm Old Fashioned" (Jerome Kern, Johnny Mercer) – 4:03
 "Osaka Saki" (Johnny Frigo) – 3:04
 "Too Late Now/Street of Dreams" (Burton Lane, Alan Jay Lerner) – 5:10
 "Bow Jest" (Frigo) – 3:30
 "Nuages" (Django Reinhardt) – 4:25
 "Jitterbug Waltz" (Richard Maltby, Jr., Fats Waller) – 6:14
 "Heather on the Hill/How Are Things in Glocca Morra?" (Lerner, Frederick Loewe) – 5:25
 "I Love Paris" (Cole Porter) – 5:01
 "Here's That Rainy Day" (Johnny Burke, James VanHeusen) – 6:19
 "Lush Life" (Billy Strayhorn) – 3:09
 "Jeannine" (Duke Pearson) – 5:04

Personnel
 Johnny Frigo – violin
 Bob Kindred – clarinet, tenor saxophone
 Joe Vito – piano
 Gene Bertoncini – guitar
 Michael Moore – double bass
 Bill Goodwin – drums

References

1994 albums
Johnny Frigo albums
Swing albums
Chesky Records albums